Kim Tae-yoon (born 25 July 1986) is a retired South Korean football defender.

Career statistics

Honors

Club
Seongnam Ilhwa Chunma
2010 AFC Champions League Winner
2011 FA Cup Winner

External links 

Kim Tae-youn at Seongnam FC 

1986 births
Living people
Association football defenders
South Korean footballers
South Korean expatriate footballers
South Korean expatriate sportspeople in Thailand
Seongnam FC players
Gimcheon Sangmu FC players
Incheon United FC players
Kim Tae-yoon
Gwangju FC players
K League 1 players
K League 2 players
Sportspeople from Busan
Expatriate footballers in Thailand